"Kiss in 77" is a song written by Charles Sherrell and recorded by James Brown. Released as a single in 1977, it charted #35 R&B. It also appeared on the album Bodyheat. Robert Christgau gave the song a negative review, commenting sarcastically that it was "as 'brand new' as the 'New Sound!' [Brown] promises" on the jacket of its host album.

References

Songs about kissing
James Brown songs
Songs written by Sweet Charles Sherrell
1977 singles
1977 songs
Polydor Records singles